Of the 15 New Jersey incumbents, 14 were re-elected.

See also 
 List of United States representatives from New Jersey
 United States House of Representatives elections, 1972

1972
New Jersey
1972 New Jersey elections